Events in the year 1831 in Mexico.

Incumbents 

 Anastasio Bustamante – President of Mexico
 Pedro José de Fonte y Hernández Miravete – Archbishop of Mexico

Governors
 Chiapas: José Ignacio Gutiérrez
 Chihuahua: 
 Coahuila: Ramón Músquiz/José María Viesca/José María de Letona/Ramón Músquiz
 Durango:  
 Guanajuato: 
 Guerrero: 
 Jalisco: José Ignacio Herrera y Cairo/José Ignacio Cañedo y Arróniz
 State of Mexico:  
 Michoacán: 
 Nuevo León: Joaquín García
 Oaxaca: 
 Puebla: 
 Querétaro: Manuel López de Ecala 
 San Luis Potosí: 
 Sinaloa: 
 Sonora: 
 Tabasco: 
 Tamaulipas: Juan Guerra/Francisco Vital Fernandez	 
 Veracruz: 
 Yucatán: 
 Zacatecas:

Events

Popular culture

Sports

Music

Literature 
José Joaquín Fernández de Lizardi's El Periquillo Sarniento is published.

Notable births

 12 September – Macedonio Alcalá in Oaxaca, Oaxaca (died 1869)

Notable deaths
 31 January – Juan Francisco Azcárate y Ledesma died in Mexico City (born 1767)
 14 February – Vicente Guerrero, leader of Mexican War of Independence and 2nd President of Mexico, assassinated (b. 1782)

References

 
Years of the 19th century in Mexico